The Otisville Tunnel is the longest tunnel on New York's Metro-North commuter railroad, at  in length. Although the track curves at the western opening, underground the tunnel is a straight line, allowing the observer to see all the way through.

It is currently owned by Metro-North, having been sold by the Norfolk Southern Railway in 2003.

History 
The tunnel was built in 1908 by the Erie Railroad at the highest point of the Graham Line. The original Erie mainline went over the hill and connected at both ends with the tunnel. Later the "over the hill" tracks were abandoned and all trains ran through the tunnel.

It later operated under the auspices of the merged Erie Lackawanna Railway from 1960 to 1976, and then Conrail from 1976 until it was acquired by Norfolk Southern as part of the breakup of Conrail.

Metro-North took over passenger service in 1983. Today, the tunnel serves trains between Otisville and Port Jervis on Metro-North Railroad's Port Jervis Line

Location 
It passes underneath the Shawangunk Ridge at Otisville, New York, just past Otisville station on the Metro-North Port Jervis Line.

See also 
List of tunnels documented by the Historic American Engineering Record in New York

References

External links 

Pictures of the eastern portal and Otisville Station

Otisville, New York
Railroad tunnels in New York (state)
Metro-North Railroad
Shawangunks
Erie Railroad tunnels
Historic American Engineering Record in New York (state)
Tunnels completed in 1908
1908 establishments in New York (state)
Transportation buildings and structures in Orange County, New York